Sundarayyar is an Indian singer, school teacher and street play performer. He is a recipient of one of India's most prestigious award, "The National award". He was awarded the National Film Award for Best Male Playback Singer in the year 2017 for lending his vocals for the soundtrack of film Joker's song "Jasemin-u".The award is highest recognition in India for playback singers.

Early life and career

Sundarayyar studied in the Government Music College, Chennai. After finishing studies he took up job of a school teacher and used to perform in the street plays.

One of his friend insisted him to audition for the film Joker. He auditioned to Sean Roldan and was selected for recording the soundtrack of the film Joker. Joker fetched him the National Film Award for Best Male Playback Singer.

Accolades
 National Film Award for Best Male Playback Singer (2017).

References

Living people
Indian male playback singers
Indian schoolteachers
Malayalam playback singers
Best Male Playback Singer National Film Award winners
Year of birth missing (living people)